The women's javelin throw event at the 1991 Pan American Games was held in Havana, Cuba on 11 August.

Results

References

Athletics at the 1991 Pan American Games
1991
Pan